On 24 February 2022, Russia launched a military invasion of Ukraine in a steep escalation of the Russo-Ukrainian War. The campaign had been preceded by a Russian military buildup since early 2021 and numerous Russian demands for security measures and legal prohibitions against Ukraine joining NATO.

 Timeline of the 2022 Russian invasion of Ukraine: prelude (up to 23 February 2022)
 Timeline of the 2022 Russian invasion of Ukraine: phase 1: Initial invasion (24 February – 7 April)
 Timeline of the 2022 Russian invasion of Ukraine: phase 2: Battle of Donbas (8 April – 11 September)
 Timeline of the 2022 Russian invasion of Ukraine: phase 3: Ukrainian counteroffensives (12 September – 9 November)
 Timeline of the 2022 Russian invasion of Ukraine: phase 4: Second stalemate (10 November – present)

See also 

 2022 in Ukraine
 2022 Russia–Ukraine peace negotiations
 Annexation of Crimea by the Russian Federation
 
 List of military engagements during the 2022 Russian invasion of Ukraine
 List of Russian generals killed during the 2022 invasion of Ukraine
 
 
 Territorial control during the Russo-Ukrainian War

References

External links 
 Institute for the Study of War's daily updates on Ukraine conflict

 
2022 timelines
Political timelines of the 2020s by year
Russo-Ukrainian War
Timelines of military conflicts since 1945
Timelines of the Russo-Ukrainian War
War crimes during the 2022 Russian invasion of Ukraine